Buddy Rogers  may refer to:

Charles Rogers (actor) (1904–1999), a.k.a. "Buddy" Rogers, American actor and jazz musician
Buddy Rogers (wrestler) (1921–1992), a.k.a. "Nature Boy", stage name of wrestler Herman Rohde